The 45th Baeksang Arts Awards ceremony took place on February 27, 2009, at the Olympic Park in Seoul. Presented by IS Plus Corp., it was broadcast on SBS and hosted by actor Tak Jae-hoon and actress Jeon Mi-seon.

Nominations and winners
Complete list of nominees and winners:

(Winners denoted in bold)

Film

Television

Other awards
 Lifetime Achievement Award - Lee Soon-jae

References

External links
 

Baeksang
Baeksang
Baeksang Arts Awards
Baek
Baek
2000s in Seoul